Shahid Mallya is an Indian playback singer who has sung in various films. He prominently sings Hindi, Punjabi and Telugu songs

Career
Initially performing playback singing for Indian TV serials, Mallya debuted in Bollywood with the song "Gurbani" from the film Yamla Pagla Deewana.

His big break came when his friend, lyricist Kumaar, recommended him to Pritam, who had him sing Rabba Main To Mar Gaya Oye and Ik Tu Hi Tu for Pankaj Kapur's directorial debut Mausam.

Film songs

Non-Film songs

Accolades

References

External links
 
 

Indian male singers
Bollywood playback singers
People from Rajasthan
Living people
1982 births